Disco Boy is a 2023 European co-production drama film directed by Giacomo Abbruzzese in his debut feature and starring Franz Rogowski as Aleksei. The film depicts the intertwined stories of Aleksei, a member of the French Foreign Legion, and a Jomo a guerrilla fighter in a village in the Niger Delta. It was selected to compete for the Golden Bear at the 73rd Berlin International Film Festival, where it had its world premiere on 19 February 2023. Giacomo Abbruzzese, the first feature director was also nominated for GWFF Best First Feature Award in the festival. It is scheduled for release in French cinemas on 5 April 2023.

Cast
 Franz Rogowski as Aleksei
 Morr Ndiaye as Jomo
 Laetitia Ky as Udoka
 Leon Lučev as Paul
 Matteo Olivetti as Francesco
 Robert Więckiewicz as Gavril
 Michał Balicki as Mikhail

Production
Development

Disco Boy is the feature film debut of Italian-born director and screenwriter Giacomo Abbruzzese. He developed the film during the Cinéfondation artist-in-residence program initiated by the Cannes Film Festival. Speaking to Cineuropa's Davide Abbatescianni, Abbruzzese revealed that Rogowski's character was born out of an encounter with a dancer who had been a soldier in a nightclub. "He explained this “dichotomy” through his body: a dancer’s body is the same as a soldier’s body. Although seemingly opposed, they actually have many things in common: discipline, the choreography involved is almost pleasurable thanks to the extreme effort involved, you return home destroyed and exhausted," Abbruzzese added.  

Casting

Franz Rogowski was cast in the role of Aleksey, and Morr Ndiaye from Gambia as Jomo. He was discovered through his participation in the documentary film Tumaranké (2018). Laetitia Ky, the Ivorian women's activist, influencer and model was cast as Udoka alongside Croatian Leon Lučev, Italian Matteo Olivetti, Polish Robert Więckiewicz and Belgian Mutamba Kalonji.

Filming

The film was shot from 13 September 2021 to 5 November 2021 in France (Paris and Reunion Island) and Polish Subcarpathia.

Release

Disco Boy had its  premiere on 19 February 2023 as part of the 73rd Berlin International Film Festival, in competition. It is scheduled to release in French cinemas on 5 April 2023.

Reception

On the review aggregator Rotten Tomatoes website, the film has an approval rating of 77% based on 13 reviews, with an average rating of 6.5/10. On Metacritic, it has a weighted average score of 71 out of 100 based on 9 reviews, indicating "Generally Favorable Reviews".

Ben Croll reviewing for IndieWire graded the film B and wrote, "Getting in, getting down, and getting out as a style-hopping sizzle reel, Disco Boy heralds a promising new talent who totally has the moves." Peter Bradshaw of The Guardian rated the film with 4 stars out of 5 and praised debut director writing, "Giacomo Abbruzzese makes a really stylish debut with Disco Boy, a visually thrilling, ambitious and distinctly freaky adventure into the heart of imperial darkness". Praising score and cinematography Bradshaw concluded, "The electronic score by Vitalic (AKA Pascal Arbez-Nicolas) throbs in its own incantatory trance and Hélène Louvart’s cinematography is a thing of beauty. It’s quite a trip."

Accolades

References

External links
 
 
 Disco Boy at Berlinale
 Disco Boy at Crew United 
 

2023 films
2020s French films
French drama films
2023 drama films
Italian drama films
2020s French-language films
Belgian drama films
Polish drama films
Films shot in Paris
Films shot in Poland
Films about the French Foreign Legion